Cyriack is a given name. Notable people with the name include:

Cyriack Garel (born 1996), French footballer
Cyriack Skinner (1627–1700), English writer

Masculine given names